The Bangladesh Nationalist Party (BNP) is a centre-right, political party in Bangladesh and one of the major political parties of Bangladesh. It was founded on 1 September 1978 by the late Bangladeshi President Ziaur Rahman after the Presidential election of 1978, with a view of uniting the people with a nationalist ideology. Following Rahman's assassination in 1981, his widow, Khaleda Zia, had taken over leadership of the party and presided as Chairperson until her imprisonment in 2018. Since her imprisonment, Tarique Rahman, the son of late president Ziaur Rahman and Khaleda Zia, has been serving as the acting Chairperson and has run the affairs of the party from London. 

Since its creation, the BNP has won the 1979 and 1981 presidential elections as well as the 1991, 1996, and 2001 general elections, respectively. Governments formed under the semi-presidential system were led by Ziaur Rahman, and the parliamentary republics were led by Khaleda Zia, who served as Prime Minister. The party holds the record of being the largest opposition in the history of parliamentary elections of the country, with 116 seats in the seventh national election of June 1996. It currently has 7 MPs in parliament following the 2018 general election.

Ideology
The party holds the ideology of Bangladesh nationalism as its core concept and adopted a 19-point program which declared that "The sovereignty and independence of Bangladesh, golden fruits of the historic liberation struggle, is our sacred trust and inviolable right". The founding manifesto of the BNP claims that the people of Bangladesh want to "...see that all-out faith and confidence in the almighty Allah, democracy, nationalism and socialism of social and economic justice are reflected in all spheres of national life".

BNP and its student wing was the driving force in the 1990 uprising against the autocratic Ershad rule that culminated in the fall of the regime and the restoration of democracy in Bangladesh. Begum Khaleda Zia, who served as the party's chairperson from 1983, was elected as the first woman Prime Minister of Bangladesh and the second female Prime Minister of a Muslim majority country after Pakistan's Benazir Bhutto.

Begum Khaleda Zia is the chairperson of the party, with Tarique Rahman as the senior vice-chairman and Mirza Fakhrul Islam Alamgir as the secretary-general.

History

JaGoDal

On 22 February 1978, a new party, Jatiyatabadi Ganatantrik Dal (JaGoDal), was formed with Justice Abdus Sattar as the coordinator. Most of the prominent figures were from the advisory council that was running the country at that time. Jagadal was the first attempt to create a platform for the nationalists of the country. Major General (retd) M.Majid ul Haq, Professor Syed Ali Ahsan, Shamsul Alam Chowdhury, A.Z.M. Enayetullah Khan, M. Hamidullah Khan, Jakaria Chowdhury, Professor Dr. M. R. Khan, and Saifur Rahman were prominent figures. JAGODAL was dissolved on 28 August 1978 to consolidate its membership under the newly formed Jatiyatabadi Front.

Jatiyatabadi Front
On 1 May 1978 the Jatiyatabadi Front or Nationalist Front was formed with Ziaur Rahman as the chief of the front, which JAGODAL joined soon after its formation. A major portion of NAP (Bhashani) joined the front as well with Mashiur Rahman. Shah Azizur Rahman with some of his colleagues from Muslim League. Kazi Zafar Ahmed and a faction of United Peoples Party, Maolana Matin with his Labour Party, and minority leader Rashraj Mandal with Tafsili Jati Federation also joined.

Ziaur Rahman was their candidate for the Presidential Election of 3 June 1978. Ziaur Rahman won the election, defeating M. A. G. Osmani of Ganatantrik Oikya Jote (United Democratic Alliance) which was backed by the Bangladesh Awami League.

Formation of BNP
After the Presidential election of 1978 the Bangladesh Nationalist Party (BNP) was established on 1 September.

The constitution of the party was drafted in 21 days of the formation with 76 members with Ziaur Rahman as the chief convener, M. Hamidullah Khan as the Executive Secretary and Dr. A. Q. M. Badruddoza Chowdhury was appointed as the Secretary General.

Founding convening committee

 Ziaur Rahman
 Justice Abdus Sattar
 Syed Masud Roomy
 Mashiur Rahman
 M. Hamidullah Khan
 Shah Azizur Rahman
 Mohammad Mohammadullah
 Abdul Halim Chowdhury
 Rashraj Mandal
 Abdul Momen Khan
 Mirza Ghulam Hafiz
 Major General (retd.) Majid-ul-Haq
 Brigadier (retd.) Nurul Islam Shishu
 Captain (retd.) Nurul Huq
 Mohammad Saifur Rahman
 K. M. Obaidur Rahman
 Moudud Ahmed
 Shamsul Huda Chowdhury
 A.Z.M. Enayetullah Khan
 S. A. Bari
 Dr. Amina Rahman
 Abdur Rahman
 Dr. M. A. Matin
 Abdul Alim
 Barrister Abul Hasnat
 Anwar Hossain Manju
 Jamal Uddin Ahmed
 Dr. A. Q. M. Badruddoza Chowdhury
 Nur Mohammad Khan
 Abdul Karim
 Shamsul Bari
 Mojibur Rahman
 Dr. Faridul Huda
 Sheikh Ali Ashraf
 Abdur Rahman Biswas
 Barrister Abdul Huq
 Imran Ali Sarker
 Dewan Sirajul Huq
 Emdadur Rahman
 M. Afsar Uddin
 Kabir Chowdhury
 Dr. M. R. Khan
 Captain (retd.) Sujat Ali
 Tushar Kanti Baroi
 Sunil Gupta
 Anisur Rahman
 Abul Kashem
 Mansur Ali Sarker
 Abdul Hamid Chowdhury
 Mansur Ali
 Julmat Ali Khan
 Nazmul Huda
 Mahbub Ahmed
 Abu Said Khan
 Mohammad Ismail
 Sirajul Huq Mantu
 Shah Badrul Huq
 Abdur Rauf
 Morsheduzzaman
 Jahir Uddin Khan
 Sultan Ahmed Chowdhury
 Toriqul Islam
 Anwarul H Khan Chowdhury
 Moin Uddin Khan
 M. A. Sattar
 Haji Jalal
 Ahmed Ali Mandal
 Shahed Ali
 Abdul Wadud
 Shah Abdul Halim
 Muhammad Jamiruddin Sircar
 Atauddin Khan
 Abdur Razzaq Chowdhury
 Ahmed Ali

The BNP formed its first government after the 1979 Bangladeshi general election. The first session of the parliament was 2 April 1979. It elected Shah Azizur Rahman as Prime Minister and leader of the parliament. Mirza Ghulam Hafiz was elected as the speaker of the parliament. Asaduzzaman Khan from the Awami League became the leader of the opposition.

During this time it attracted a large pool of supporters and activists who joined the newly formed students wing and youth wing. After the formation of the government, the first executive committee of the party was declared. A national standing committee was formed as the highest decision-making forum of the party with 12 members.

Founding National Standing Committee

 Ziaur Rahman
 Abdus Sattar
 Shah Azizur Rahman
 Major General (retd.) Majid-ul-Haq
 Abdur Razzaq Chowdhury
 Sheikh Razzak Ali
 Barrister Muhammad Jamiruddin Sircar
 Ekramul Huq
 Dr. A. Q. M. Badruddoza Chowdhury
 Syed Muhibul Hasan
 Amina Rahman
 A.S.M. Yusuf
 Barrister Nazmul Huda

A youth wing was formed in September 1978 which was named Bangladesh Jatiyatabadi Jubo Dal with Abul Kashem as chief convener. The Dhaka unit convener was Saifur Rahman. Within a couple of months the central executive committee of Jubo Dal was declared with Abul Kashem and Saifur Rahman as the President and general secretary respectively. Mirza Abbas became the Dhaka unit President with Kamruzzaman Ayat Ali as the Secretary General.

1981–1982
On 30 May 1981 the founder of the party President Ziaur Rahman was assassinated in the Chittagong Circuit House by a small group of military officials. After the assassination of Ziaur Rahman, large crowds started protesting in major cities like Dhaka and Chittagong. The funeral of Ziaur Rahman became a huge event with the participation of millions of people in Dhaka.

In the 1981 Bangladeshi presidential election Abdus Sattar was elected. He formed a National Security Council to involve the Bangladesh Armed Forces. Meanwhile, Vice-president Mirza Nurul Huda resigned from his post in March 1982.

Military coup d'état, 1982
Army Chief Hussain Muhammad Ershad thwarted the elected government of Justice Sattar on 24 March 1982 and replaced him with Justice A. F. M. Ahsanuddin Chowdhury. The BNP was thrown out of power. Many of its leaders were imprisoned, including former Minister S.A. Bari, Saifur Rahman, Habibullah Khan, Tanvir Ahmed Siddiqui, Atauddin Khan, Jamal Uddin Ahmed, K.M. Obaidur Rahman, Abul Hasnat, and Moudud Ahmed. 233 leaders of BNP were arrested from March to July 1982.

7-Party Alliance
From 1983, Begum Khaleda Zia became the de facto decision maker of the party. Under her leadership the BNP formed a new anti-government alliance against the autocratic Ershad regime. It was named after the number of parties with it, 7-Party Alliance.

BNP launched a massive anti-government movement after co-ordination with Awami League led 15-Party Alliance from September 1983.
The 7-Party Alliance arranged a mass gathering and called a nationwide strike on 1 November 1983. The strike was very successful. After that the alliance called to surround the Secretariat on 28 November 1983 along with the 15-Party Alliance. Thousands of BNP activists led by then Executive Secretary (later designated Office Secretary) M. Hamidullah Khan surrounded the secretariat building at Paltan and broke large hole of the southern corner of the boundary wall of the building. The police retaliated with indiscriminate firing of live bullets. M. Hamidullah Khan was arrested on 3 November in the afternoon from his residence at Dhaka Cantonment. A ban on political activities was imposed that night and Begum Khaleda Zia was kept under house arrest. The illegal regime was severely shaken at the core. A long curfew and ban on politics was imposed.

On 29 February 1984, Ershad declared that the ban on politics would be lifted on 26 March and on 27 May both the Presidential and national election would be held. The 7-Party Alliance asked for the national election prior to the Presidential election. After the lifting of the ban, Khaleda Zia attended an extended meeting of the party on 1 April where she was made the acting chairperson of the party. In May, the Chairperson Justice Sattar resigned and Khaleda Zia was made the chairperson of the party.

Under the leadership of Khaleda Zia, the first major step BNP took was to expel leaders like Shah Azizur Rahman, Moudud Ahmed, AKM Maidul Islam, Abdul Alim, and Barrister Sultan Ahmed Chowdhury from the party. These leaders formed a committee with Shah Aziz as the President and AKM Maidul Islam as the general secretary. This faction later joined the Jatiya Front and Jatiya Party.

Attack on Begum Khaleda Zia
On 23 September 1984 while addressing a rally in Bogra, 10 or 12 handmade grenades were charged on the rally while some of them were aimed at the stage where Khaleda Zia was giving her speech. Khaleda Zia narrowly escaped injury while eleven of her party received severe injuries. A nationwide strike was called in protest at this attack on 22 and 27 December. The government imposed a ban on political activities on those days to foil the strike, but it was largely ignored. Two people including a student leader from Bangladesh, Jatiotabadi Chatra Dal, died when police fired on a crowd on 22 December.

Upazila election 1985

The government, amid protests, held upazila elections on 15 May 1985 in 251 upazilas and on 20 May in 209. The election was marked by rigging, stuffing, snatching of ballots and electoral fraud. Ershad's newly formed Janadal got 190 candidates as victors. Though BNP was in trouble because of government repression, it got 46 of its leader as upazila chairmen while the Awami League fared worse with 41 upazila chairman.

Formation of student alliance
In 1985, BNP's students wing Bangladesh Jatiotabadi Chatra Dal formed Shongrami Chatra Jote with Chatra League (Awranga), Chatra League (Pradhan) and five other student organisations and started its resistance against Ershad.

General election 1986
In March 1986, Ershad declared that a national election would be held on 26 April. Both the 7-Party Alliance led by BNP and the 15-Party Alliance led by the Awami League declared a boycott of the election on 17 March. Both called a joint rally on 21 March and a nationwide strike on 22 March as the immediate program to thwart the forthcoming election.

The night before the nationwide strike on 22 March, the Awami League called a meeting of the 15-Party Alliance but Sheikh Hasina refused to take part in the meeting. In the meeting majority of the parties including the Awami League opined in favour of the election. General Khalilur Rahman of Awami League was maintaining close contacts with the army headquarters during the meeting that night. Sheikh Hasina was having discussion with General Khalil periodically.

On the final hours of 21 March 1986, Sheikh Hasina announced that the Awami League and her alliance would participate in the election. Five parties of the alliance parted ways from the Awami League after the announcement and decided to boycott the election. BNP and the 7-Party Alliance with the newly formed 5-Party alliance of leftists started campaigning against the election while the Awami League and Bangladesh Jamaat-e-Islami joined the election.

The election was largely boycotted. BNP Chairperson mobilised a large pool of political parties and their leaders behind her to boycott the election. Apart from the BNP led 7-Party Alliance and leftist 5-Party Alliance, 17 more parties including BNP (Shah Aziz), Samajbadi Dal (Nirmal Sen), Democratic League (Moshtaq), Democratic League (Oli Ahad), Islamic Democratic League, Islami Andolon (M. A. Jalil), Janata Party, Jatiya Ganatantrik Party, Labour Party (Maolana Matin), Muslim League (Kamruzzaman), Progatishil Ganatantrik Shakti and so on.

Khaleda Zia reiterated that the BNP would participate only if:

 The fundamental rights are restored
 All political prisoners are released
 All convictions of politicians by the military courts are cancelled

The anti-election alliance under BNP called for a nationwide strike on election day. Unrest, voting fraud and malpractices marked the election day according to the opposition parties. Both the Awami League and Jamaat-e-Islami conceded humiliating defeat in the election.

General Hussain Mohammad Ershad got himself elected on 15 October 1986. Prior to the election, Khaleda Zia was put under house arrest on 13 October.

In a joint declaration, the two alliances called for "Siege Dhaka" program on 10 November 1987. The government imposed a ban on public gatherings ahead of the program which was defied on the day, and during the program, the capital of the country virtually went under the control of the opposition alliances. This incident infuriated the opposition and a nationwide protest was called on the following day. The government came hard handed and both Khaleda Zia and Sheikh Hasina was put under house arrest on 11 October. Both the parties and their partners in the movement declared frequent nationwide strikes for the next days until the end of the year.

General election 1988
BNP was determined about not to join poll under Ershad regime and decided to boycott the general election of 1988 after the abolishment of the previous parliament. The election was held on 3 March without the participation of any popular party or alliance rather a combined opposition was made led by ASM Abdur Rab. BNP called a nationwide on the Election Day and declared they would resist the election.

Organizational reformations
On the advice of Dr. Badruddoza Chowdhury, BNP chief Begum Zia, on 21 June 1988, suspended the national standing committee and executive committee on the party for various reasons including the failures to strengthening the party of leaders. During this opportunity former military officers were also removed from leadership positions within the party. M. Hamidullah Khan was relieved from his post as Executive Secretary. On 3 July 1988 Barrister Abdus Salam Talukder, a distinguished lawyer, was assigned with the post of Secretary General of the party instead of KM Obaidur Rahman. Soon after the removal of Obaidur, he with Jamal Uddin Ahmed and Abul Hasnat formed a new party with the same name. On 17 July of the same year, Shah Azizur Rahman dissolved the BNP faction with him and joined the party with his followers on 26 August. Barrister Abdus Salam Talukder restructured the BNP, making it a stronger political platform that thrived through the critical time to topple Ershad regime.

1990 Mass Uprising

The movement against Ershad started gaining momentum from October 1990. The BNP led 7-party alliance, the Awami League led 8-party alliance and the Leftist 5-party alliance started a movement to usurp Ershad from 10 October 1990 and declared a nationwide strike on that day. The strike claimed 5 lives, including the three BNP activists who were rallying in front of the central office of the Jatiya Party when the Jatiya Party cadres opened fire on the crowd.

On 28 November, the opposition parties including BNP and its student wing defied the curfew and state of emergency and came out with large processions. The curfew and state of emergency was the last resort for Ershad that became ineffective by the end of November 1990. On 3 December, the protests became more violent and many died. Bombs were hurled at the Sena Kalyan Sangstha building at Motijhil. From 27 November to 3 December, more than fifty protesters died. On 4 December, the mass uprising took place and Ershad declared his resignation.

Students movement
Dhaka University Central Students Union (DUCSU) which has always been a centre of all popular movements in the history of Bangladesh came under the control of Bangladesh Jatiotabadi Chatra Dal after the election of 3 June 1990. The Amanullah Aman-Khairul Kabir Khokan panel backed by Chatra Dal won all the posts and took the lead of the students' movement in the University of Dhaka campus.

The Chatra Dal led DUCSU committee forged an alliance with all existing students group in the campus, Sarbadaliya Chatra Oikya Parishad (All-party Students Alliance Council) and staged a demonstration on 1 October 1990. The protests turned violent after the police firing on a rally of Chatra Dal on 10 October that claimed the life of Naziruddin Jehad, a Chatra Dal leader from Sirajganj who came to Dhaka to join the rally against Ershad.

The series of student protests compelled the Ershad regime to think about a safe exit.

Solidarity of teachers
On 7 December 1989, the BNP supported White panel of teachers got the highest number of Deans elected from their panel including Professor Anwarullah Chowdhury, Professor S M Faiz, Assistant Professor M. Anwar Hossain and Associate Professor Humayun Ahmed.

The pro-BNP White panel of teachers, which dominated the Dhaka University Teachers Association, declared an all-out movement against the Ershad regime in 1990. All the teachers decided to resign from their post on 29 November and confirmed their decision of not returning to classes until the fall of Ershad. The firm reaction from the teachers jeopardised the Ershad regime.

After the fall of Ershad, because of the commitment to the national interest the White panel of teachers won a decisive victory on 24 December 1990 in the election of Dhaka University Teachers Association once again with Professor Anwarullah Chowdhury as the President of the association with Professor M. Anwar Hossain as the general secretary.

Caretaker government (2006–2008)

The military-backed government promised to tackle the longstanding problems of corruption, filing charges against more than 160 politicians, civil servants and businessmen in 2007. Among those charged were Khaleda Zia and her two sons, as well as Sheikh Hasina, leader of the Awami League.

The Bangladesh Election Commission invited Hafizuddin's faction, rather than Khaleda Zia's, to participate in talks, effectively recognising the former as the legitimate BNP. Khaleda Zia challenged this in court, but her appeal was rejected on 10 April 2008. After her release later that year, Zia was restored to her position as party leader.

In the 2008 Bangladesh general election, the 4-party alliance led by BNP won 33 seats out of 299 constituencies, of which the BNP alone got 30.

5th National Council, 2009

After sanctions by the Election Commission, the party held country-wide events in order for local leaders to play an active role in the national party. The BNP National Council empowered re-elected party chairperson Khaleda Zia to pick other members for the National Executive Committee and Standing Committee. It elected her eldest son, Tarique Rahman, to the powerful post as Senior vice-chairman, in a "move apparently designed to smooth his path to the party helm."

Post-election campaigns (2012 – present)
After several movements in a period of severe political unrest between 2012 and 2014 to prevent the ruling party holding the 10th general election in January 2014 without a neutral caretaker government, Khaleda led BNP and its allies in a boycott of the election. Incidents of violence were reported on polling day including bombing of election centres, which the BNP and its allies were accused of. Over 100 people were killed in the 2016 Union Parishad Election in violent clashes between Awami League and BNP supporters. In 2016 the BNP announced its new National Standing Committee, in which Khaleda retained her position as chairperson. New members were recruited while some older members were removed, and various new strategies for party operation were formulated. In May 2017 Khaleda revealed BNP's Vision 2030 to gain public support for the next general elections. However the ruling Awami League government denounced Vision 2030 as an act of plagiarism of Awami League's Vision 2021 which they used in the ninth general election, and claimed most of the targets in the Visions were fulfilled by Awami League, thus declaring BNP's Vision 2030 as unoriginal. BNP also announced it will hold processions to hold the 11th general elections under a neutral government. This renewed tensions between BNP and Awami League.

On 8 February 2018 Khaleda Zia and her son Tarique Rahman as per court verdict, were jailed for 5 and 10 years respectively due to involvement in the Zia Charitable Trust corruption case. While Tarique was on exile, Khaleda would be imprisoned on old Dhaka Central Jail on Nazimuddin Road. In protest BNP held nationwide demonstrations, which were foiled by well-prepared police force across the nation. A large number of BNP activists were arrested during clashes with the police during the protests against Khaleda's imprisonment.

Jatiya Oikya Front

After the jailing of chairperson Begum Khaleda Zia, BNP expedited the process to forge a national unity with prominent leaders of the country. In October 2018, the party formally announced its joining of Jatiya Oikya Front with Dr. Kamal Hossain at its forefront.

There was controversy in the run up to the elections surrounding the nomination of banned Jamaati candidates under the BNP banner. In 2013 the hard-line, right-wing, Islamist party, Jamaat-e-Islami was banned from registering and therefore contesting in elections by the High Court, citing their charter in violation of the constitution. However 25 Jamaati candidates ran in the election, with 22 nominations for BNP and 3 running as independents. An investigation was launched but on 23 December the Election Commission Secretary Helaluddin Ahmed said they had examined the related law and "there is no scope for rejecting the Jamaat leaders' candidacy at this moment." On 26 December, just days before the election, Jatiya Oikya Front leader Kamal Hossain expressed his regret about Jamaat's involvement in the elections under his alliance, claiming "had I known [that Jamaat leaders will be given BNP tickets] I would not have been part of it." The media however had reported at the end of November that this was happening.

2024 General Election 
On March 26, 2020, BNP chairperson Khaleda Zia's prison sentence was suspended for six months in the midst of the COVID-19 pandemic, and she was granted a conditional release on the grounds that she receive medical treatment within the country and not travel abroad. The six month suspension has been granted for a total of six consecutive times, with the most recent one being in September 18, 2022. Since Zia's release, the BNP has campaigned for her unconditional release and for the ruling government to allow her to travel abroad.

In preparation for the upcoming 2023 general election, the BNP has launched a series of rallies which advocate for the resignation of Prime Minister Sheikh Hasina and the return of the Caretaker Government. During a rally held in Dhaka on December 10, 2022, seven BNP lawmakers announced their resignation from the current government in demands of the dissolution of parilament, the formation of a new election commission, and allowing the election to be held under a neutral caretaker government.

Party leaders
Error

Current leadership
 Acting Chairman: Tarique Rahman
 Chairperson: Khaleda Zia
 Secretary General: Mirza Fakhrul Islam Alamgir
 Senior Vice Chairperson: Tarique Rahman

Electoral history

Presidential Elections

Jatiya Sangsad elections

See also
 Politics of Bangladesh
 List of political parties in Bangladesh
 Hartal in Bangladesh
 Economy of Bangladesh
 Jatiyatabadi Samajik Sangskritik Sangstha

References

Bibliography

External links
 

 
Political parties in Bangladesh
Political parties established in 1978
1978 establishments in Bangladesh
Right-wing politics in Bangladesh